The 1929 All-Ireland Senior Hurling Championship Final was the 42nd All-Ireland Final and the culmination of the 1929 All-Ireland Senior Hurling Championship, an inter-county hurling tournament for the top teams in Ireland. The match was held at Croke Park, Dublin, on 1 September 1929, between Cork and Galway. The Connacht men lost to their Munster opponents on a score line of 4-9 to 1-3.

Match details

References

1
All-Ireland Senior Hurling Championship Finals
Cork county hurling team matches
All-Ireland Senior Hurling Championship Final
All-Ireland Senior Hurling Championship Final, 1929